Lennart Eriksson may refer to:

Lennart Eriksson (handballer) (born 1944), Swedish handball player
Lennart Eriksson (musician) (born 1956), Swedish punk rock musician
Lennart Eriksson (wrestler) (1939–2017), Swedish Olympic wrestler